Ting Kau Bridge is a  long cable-stayed bridge in Hong Kong that spans from the northwest of Tsing Yi Island and Tuen Mun Road. It is near the Tsing Ma Bridge which also serves as a major connector between the Hong Kong International Airport on Lantau Island and the rest of Hong Kong. It was completed on 5 May 1998. The bridge is toll-free.

The bridge is part of Route 3, connecting Northwest New Territories with Hong Kong Island. Other major structures on the road include the Tai Lam Tunnel, the Cheung Tsing Tunnel, the Cheung Tsing Bridge and the Western Harbour Crossing. The Ting Kau Bridge carries the heaviest traffic volume of the bridges on the Lantau Link, with many container trucks travelling between mainland China and the HK container port. A chromatic study and specially designed architectural lighting are intended to set the bridge off in its surroundings.

Design
Ting Kau Contractors Joint Venture designed and built Ting Kau Bridge between 1995 and 1998. The joint venture consisted of lead partners Cubiertas Y Mzov (22%) and Entrecanales Y Tavora (22%), both of Spain (now both part of Acciona, S.A); Germany's Ed. Züblin (22%); Australia's Downer and Co (22%); and Hong Kong's Paul Y(12%). Constructing engineers were Schlaich Bergermann & Partner.

The design and construction cost of the bridge was HK$1.94 billion. It is one of the longest cable-stayed bridges in the world. Along with the Tsing Ma and Kap Shui Mun bridges, it is closely monitored by the Wind and Structural Health Monitoring System (WASHMS).

Ting Kau Bridge is the world's first major 4-span cable-stayed bridge. This meant that the central tower had to be stabilised longitudinally, which was accomplished using the longest cable stays ever used in a bridge. The design of this bridge contains special features such as single leg towers, which are stabilised by transverse cables like the masts of a sailboat. The Ting Kau Bridge and approach viaducts link the western New Territories and the mainland to the Lantau Fixed Crossing expressway, which connects the airport to Kowloon and Hong Kong. It meets the Lantau Fixed Crossing on Tsing Yi Island,  from the Tsing Ma Bridge.

The arrangement of separate decks on both sides of the 3 towers contributes to the slender appearance of the bridge while helping it act favourably under heavy wind and typhoon loads. Each deck carries 3 traffic lanes and a hard shoulder.

Measurements
Total length: 
Length of main spans:  and 
Main tower height: 
Ting Kau tower height: 
Tsing Yi tower height: 
Deck surface area: 
Deck cable steel weight: 2,800 tonnes
Structural steel deck weight: 8,900 tonnes
Weight of concrete panels 29,000 tonnes
Distance of wind give: 
Reinforcement deck: 
Reinforcement towers: 
Span lengths: 
Number of stay cables: 384
Movements
Vertical at mid-span: 
Lateral at mid-span: 
Longitudinal at End Pier or Tsing Yi Abutment:

References

See also

 Transport in Hong Kong

Bridges completed in 1998
Bridges in Hong Kong
Cable-stayed bridges in Hong Kong
Extra areas operated by NT taxis
Route 3 (Hong Kong)
Ting Kau
Tsing Yi
1998 establishments in Hong Kong